The New York Racing Association, Inc. (NYRA) is the not-for-profit corporation that operates the three largest Thoroughbred horse racing tracks in the state of New York, United States: Aqueduct Racetrack in South Ozone Park, Queens; Belmont Park in Elmont; and Saratoga Race Course in Saratoga Springs.

Racing at NYRA tracks is year-round, operating at Belmont Park from May to mid-July and from September through October; at Saratoga Race Course from mid-July through Labor Day; and at Aqueduct from November through April.

The New York Racing Association is the successor to the Greater New York Association, a non-profit racing association created in 1955. NYRA is separate from the governing body that oversees racing in New York, the former New York State Racing and Wagering Board (now the New York State Gaming Commission).

History
In 1913, racing returned to New York after a hiatus due to the Hart–Agnew Law. Only four tracks had survived the hiatus. These were Aqueduct Racetrack (the Big A), Belmont Park, Jamaica Racetrack and Saratoga Race Course. The tracks came under common ownership with the creation of a non-profit association known as the Greater New York Association in 1955. The association remodeled Aqueduct Racetrack, Belmont Park, and Saratoga Race Course and demolished Jamaica, which is now the Rochdale Village housing development. The partnership became the New York Racing Association on April 10, 1958.  Later, Belmont Park was closed from 1963 to 1968 in order to construct a new grandstand.

Off-track betting in New York was established in 1970, being offered by regional, government-owned corporations. OTB parlors began showing live video feeds of races (referred to as simulcasting) in 1984. In 1995, NYRA launched a cable television channel and a telephone advance-deposit wagering service.

From December 2003 through September 2005, NYRA operated under a deferred prosecution agreement following a 2003 federal indictment. The charges related alleged income tax evasion and money laundering by mutuel clerks between 1980 and 1999 with the knowledge of NYRA middle managers. Under the agreement, NYRA paid $3 million to the government and its implementation of new cash-handling procedures designed to eliminate corruption and mismanagement was monitored by a New York law firm.  After receiving a report from the monitor which concluded that NYRA was in compliance with the new guidelines, the Justice Department moved to dismiss the indictment and its motion was allowed by a federal judge.

NYRA, claiming that the state lottery division's failure to approve the installation of video-lottery terminal (VLT) machines at Aqueduct Racetrack pushed it to insolvency, filed for Chapter 11 bankruptcy protection on November 2, 2006.  The association emerged from bankruptcy protection September 12, 2008 with incorporation of a successor corporation, New York Racing Association Inc. New York City's OTB Corporation shut down in 2010.

In 2016, NYRA launched an online advance-deposit wagering platform under the brand NYRA Bets, which offers live bets and live simulcasts, and is available on multiple states.

Restructuring
NYRA was reorganized and its franchise to operate the three racetracks was extended through 2033 under legislation approved by the New York state legislature on February 13, 2008.  The new authorization provided $105 million in direct state aid and forgave millions more in state loans to NYRA. The association also gave up its claim to ownership of the land on which the three racetracks are situated. In return, the state gained expanded oversight responsibility. The state comptroller  won the power to audit NYRA's books. The conversion of NYRA from a non-profit association to a not-for-profit corporation also gave the state attorney general enhanced oversight authority.  In addition, the state now appoints 11 of the corporation's 25 directors.  By changing from non-profit to not-for-profit status, NYRA also gained flexibility in its financial management.

Law Enforcement Force

NYRA maintains its own law enforcement force comprising over 150 sworn law enforcement officers.

Peace Officers
The force consists of uniformed officers and supervisors, fire marshals, and plain clothed investigators and inspectors, all of whom maintain New York State Peace Officer status, thus giving them arrest and investigatory powers, the authority to issue summonses, and the ability to carry defensive weapons including a firearm, baton, pepper spray, and handcuffs. Uniformed members wear navy blue style uniforms.

Security Officers
NYRA also employs New York State registered security officers at Saratoga Race Course during its racing meet, as well sub contracts private security guard companies to assist with large details downstate such as Belmont Stakes.

See also
 Agriculture & New York State Horse Breeding Development Fund
 New York State Thoroughbred Breeding and Development Fund Corporation
 New York Wine/Grape Foundation
 Olympic Regional Development Authority
 United Nations Development Corporation

References

External links
NYRA.com – Official site
NYRAinc.com – Corporate site
NYRABets.com – ADW site

 
Public benefit corporations in New York (state)
Belmont Stakes
Horse racing companies
Horse racing venue owners
Horse racing organizations in the United States
1955 establishments in New York (state)
Sports organizations established in 1955
Organizations based in Queens, New York